Sleet is a regionally variant term for some meteorological phenomena:

Ice pellets, pellets of ice composed of frozen raindrops or refrozen melted snowflakes (United States)
Rain and snow mixed, snow that partially melts as it falls (United Kingdom, Ireland, Canada, and most Commonwealth countries)
Glaze, a smooth coating of ice formed on objects by freezing rain.

People with the surname
David Sleet
Don Sleet
Gregory M. Sleet
Jessie Sleet Scales
Moneta Sleet Jr.